Jonathan Mejía Ruiz (born 7 January 1989), commonly known as Jona, is a Honduran professional footballer who plays for Spanish club UD Torre del Mar as a striker.

Club career
Born in Málaga, Andalusia, Jona only played lower league football in his beginnings, always in the Segunda División B. He represented in quick succession Lorca Deportiva CF, UD Melilla, Deportivo Fabril, Zamora CF and CD Ourense.

In mid-January 2013, after excelling in the first half of the season with Ourense, Jona was acquired by La Liga club Granada CF, being immediately loaned to Vitória S.C. of Portugal. He made his Primeira Liga debut with the latter on 4 March, playing two minutes in a 2–0 home win against Académica de Coimbra.

In the following years, Jona all but competed in the Spanish Segunda División, representing Real Jaén, Cádiz CF (two spells), Albacete Balompié, UCAM Murcia CF, Córdoba CF and CD Lugo. He was relegated from that level three times.

Jona terminated his contract with Córdoba on 15 January 2019, and signed a two-and-a-half-year deal with third division side Hércules CF the following day.

International career
Jona's father, Leonidas Mejía, was a Honduran from Tegucigalpa, and his mother was Spanish. In April 2013, he expressed interest in representing the Honduras national team.

Jona made his debut on 2 June 2013, in a friendly with Israel. He represented the nation at the 2014 Copa Centroamericana.

Personal life
Jona's older brother, Antonio Moreno, was also a footballer and a forward. He played once with Sevilla FC's first team, and also represented Cádiz.

References

External links

1989 births
Living people
Spanish people of Honduran descent
Honduran people of Spanish descent
Spanish footballers
Honduran footballers
Footballers from Málaga
Association football forwards
Segunda División players
Segunda División B players
Primera Federación players
Tercera Federación players
Lorca Deportiva CF footballers
UD Melilla footballers
Deportivo Fabril players
Zamora CF footballers
CD Ourense footballers
Granada CF footballers
Real Jaén footballers
Cádiz CF players
Albacete Balompié players
UCAM Murcia CF players
Córdoba CF players
CD Lugo players
Hércules CF players
CD Alcoyano footballers
Primeira Liga players
Liga Portugal 2 players
Vitória S.C. B players
Vitória S.C. players
Honduras international footballers
2014 Copa Centroamericana players
Spanish expatriate footballers
Honduran expatriate footballers
Expatriate footballers in Portugal
Spanish expatriate sportspeople in Portugal